Arthroleptis kutogundua, also known as the overlooked squeaker frog, is a species of frog in the family Arthroleptidae. It has not been seen since 1930, and is believed to be possibly extinct.

Taxonomy

Originally, Arthroleptis kutogundua was incorrectly identified as Arthroleptis adolfifriederici. It was formally described as a new species in 2012 by David C. Blackburn. He gave it the specific epithet 'kutogundua' from a Kiswahili word for 'to not discover', referring to the fact that its original collector did not recognize it as a new species.

Description

Arthroleptis kutogundua is larger than most members of its genus, with the only known specimen being 44.4mm long. They have longer toes and  less prominent tympanums than other members of their genus as well.

Habitat and distribution

Arthroleptis kutogundua is only known from its type locality, Ngozi Crater in the Poronto Mountains of Tanzania. The holotype was collected while hopping on the sodden forest floor, and the species is believed to believed to be terrestrial and associated with leaf litter.

History

The holotype and only known specimen of Arthroleptis kutogundua was an adult female, collected on March 19, 1930, by herpetologist Arthur Loveridge. He incorrectly identified it as Arthroleptis adolfifriederici. The species has not been seen since then. In 2012, herpetologist David Blackburn reassessed the specimen, and identified it as a new species. His recommendation was that the species be classed as Data Deficient by the IUCN. The IUCN assessed the species on October 1, 2012, and classified it as Critically Endangered and possibly extinct.

References

kutogundua
Amphibians of Tanzania
Endemic fauna of Tanzania
Amphibians described in 2012